Northern Light is Covenant's fifth full-length album, released by Sony KA2 (Europe) and Metropolis Records (US) in October, 2002. A limited edition digipak version of the album was also released, along with 1000 numbered double vinyl releases.

Sony copies of this record included copy-protection technology in an attempt to prevent consumers from digitizing their album.

Track listing

Bonus tracks
The vinyl release included four bonus tracks, including two exclusive tracks.

 Bullet (Club version) - 5:35
 Call the Ships to Port (Club Version) - 6:04
 Bullet (Funky Indian) - 5:38
 Don't Go - 4:04

Chart positions

References

2002 albums
Covenant (band) albums
Metropolis Records albums